Groß Mohrdorf is a municipality in the Vorpommern-Rügen district, in Mecklenburg-Vorpommern, Germany.

Schloss Hohendorf is located in Groß Mohrdorf municipality.

References